An Advancement of Learning is a 1971 crime novel by Reginald Hill, the second novel in the Dalziel and Pascoe series.

In this novel, the detectives investigate a murder at the fictional Holm Coultram College. More bodies are found after their arrival on campus. In this novel, Pascoe's future wife joins the action as a faculty member whom he knew from years past.

The book's title is an homage to Francis Bacon's (1561–1626) philosophical tome, The Advancement of Learning.

References

Publication history
1971, London: Collins Crime Club , Pub date 1971, Hardback
1987, New York: Signet (Penguin) , Paperback
1996, Toronto: Harper Collins Canada , Paperback
2008, New York: Felony & Mayhem Press , Pub date 2008.

1971 British novels
Novels by Reginald Hill
Campus novels
Collins Crime Club books